Granville Park is a multi-purpose sporting and recreation reserve in Merrylands, New South Wales. It is located on 13.2 hectares of land approximately 24 kilometres west of Sydney and was formally opened in 1887 by the then Mayor, John Nobbs. One of the first sports clubs to play at Granville Park was the Granville Royals Rugby Club in the late 1880s.

The land was owned by the  City of Parramatta until May 2017 when the newly created Cumberland Council inherited the park, as a result of New South Wales council mergers.

The main field, known for sponsorship purposes as Merrylands RSL Rugby Park, is now the home ground of the Parramatta Two Blues club, founded in 1879, which competes in Sydney's premier rugby union competition, the Shute Shield. Total capacity for the ground is 5,000, of which 1,000 is seated. The clubhouse has a large hall suitable for hosting functions as well as changing room facilities and amenities. The main field has lighting suitable for hosting night time sports events.

Granville Park is also one of the home grounds for the Greater Sydney Rams team that plays in the National Rugby Championship. The New South Wales Waratahs team plays occasional pre-season trial matches at the ground.

There are also sporting facilities for soccer, cricket, and basketball. A children's Splash Park was built in 2014, and the reserve also has barbeque and picnic facilities.

References

Sports venues in Sydney
Soccer venues in Sydney
Rugby league stadiums in Australia
Rugby union stadiums in Australia